The International North–South Transport Corridor (INSTC) is a 7,200-km-long multi-mode network of ship, rail, and road route for moving freight between India, Iran, Azerbaijan, Russia, Central Asia and Europe. The route primarily involves moving freight from India, Iran, Azerbaijan and Russia via ship, rail and road. The objective of the corridor is to increase trade connectivity between major cities such as Mumbai, Moscow, Tehran, Baku, Bandar Abbas, Astrakhan, Bandar Anzali, etc. Dry runs of two routes were conducted in 2014, the first was Mumbai to Baku via Bandar Abbas and the second was Mumbai to Astrakhan via Bandar Abbas, Tehran and Bandar Anzali. The objective of the study was to identify and address key bottlenecks. The results showed transport costs were reduced by "$2,500 per 15 tons of cargo". Other routes under consideration include via Kazakhstan and Turkmenistan.

This will also synchronize with the Ashgabat agreement, a Multimodal transport agreement signed by India (2018), Oman (2011), Iran (2011), Turkmenistan (2011), Uzbekistan, (2011) Kazakhstan (2015)  (figure in the bracket indicates the year of joining the agreement), for creating an international transport and transit corridor facilitating transportation of goods between Central Asia and the Persian Gulf. This route will be operationalised by mid-January 2018.

Objectives

The primary objective of the NSTC project is to reduce costs in terms of time and money over the traditional route currently being used. Analysts predict by having improved transport connectivity between Russia, Central Asia, Iran and India their respective bilateral trade volumes will increase. A study conducted by the 'Federation of Freight Forwarders’ Associations in India (FFFAI) www.fffai.org  found the route is, "30% cheaper and 40% shorter than the current traditional route". Analysts predict the corridor is likely to increase trade connectivity between major cities such as Mumbai, Moscow, Tehran, Baku, Bandar Abbas, Astrakhan, Bandar Anzali etc.

History

Russia, Iran and India signed the agreement for the NSTC project on 16 May 2002. All three countries are founding member states on the project. Other important member states include Azerbaijan, Armenia, Kazakhstan and Belarus with other states having varying levels of involvement. Azerbaijan is heavily involved in the project currently building new train lines and roads to complete missing links in the NSTC. Turkmenistan currently is not a formal member but is likely to have a road connectivity to the corridor. Prime Minister Modi during a state visit to Turkmenistan formally invited it to become a member state on the project, "I also proposed that Turkmenistan becomes a member of the International North South Transport Corridor."

Member states

Observer member — .

Azerbaijan road and rail routes

The NSTC route through Azerbaijan allows India–Iran–Azerbaijan–Russia–Kazakhstan transport connectivity. Iran started construction work to complete the missing link of the Qazvin-Rasht-Astara road and railway (205 km) including the Rasht-Astara section (164 km). It involves construction of 369 km of bridges and railway line to link the southern sections to the northern ones. Once completed, 22 new tunnels and 15 bridges will have been added to the route.

On January 7, 2017, it was announced that Rasht-Astara section of rail route was already completed in 2016, the remaining construction of Qazvin to Rasht rail rote is 90% complete and will be completed within 2017, construction on the remaining Rasht-Astara section of road would also start in 2017.

Chabahar NSTC integration

India and Iran have a long-standing agreement, signed in 2002, to develop Chabahar into full deep sea port. Bandar Abbas port handles 85% of Iran's seaborne trade and is highly congested. Whereas, Chabahar has high capacity with plans to expand it from its current capacity of 2.5 million to 12.5 million tons annually. Unlike Bandar Abbas, Chabahar has the ability to handle cargo ships bigger than 100,000 tons. Industry Analysts have highlighted there are long term plans to integrate Chabahar with the NSTC, "India is also eyeing trade with Europe via Chabahar port and the International North-South Transport Corridor".

Kazakhstan–Turkmenistan-Iran railway link 

It links Uzen in Kazakhstan with Bereket - Etrek in Turkmenistan and ends at Gorgan in Iran's Golestan province. In Iran, the railway will be linked to national network making its way to the ports of the Persian Gulf.

The project is estimated to cost $620m which is being jointly funded by the governments of Kazakhstan, Turkmenistan and Iran.

The project also aims to create a multimodal transport system to provide seamless connectivity in the region for passenger travel as well.

Work in Turkmenistan commenced in Bereket in December 2007 and in Kazakhstan in July 2009.

A  section between Bereket and Uzen in Turkmenistan is being financed by the Asian Development Bank (ADB). A memorandum of understanding was signed between ADB and the Turkmenistan government in February 2010, for a $350m loan as a special fund for technical assistance. The project loan was for the installation of signalling and communication equipment on the ongoing railway line, procurement of equipment and maintenance facilities, consulting, and for the management and supervision of construction. The project also received a loan of $371.2m from the Islamic Development Bank in July 2010. In May 2013, a Bereket – Uzen section was completed.

Currently, railway stations along the new railway are being constructed.

Bereket city (Kazandjik) is strategically important railway crossroad of the Trans-Caspian Railway (Caspian Sea, Turkmenistan, Uzbekistan and eastern Kazakhstan) and North-South Transnational Railway. The city has a large locomotive repair depot and a modern passenger and freight railway station.

In December 2014 the railway opened.

Armenia–Iran Railway Concession 
Armenia–Iran Railway Concession, also called as Southern Armenia Railway or North-South Railway Corridor, as of April 2017, the project remains only on paper and has no financier as the economic feasibility is doubtful, though Armenia continues to try to find sponsors and private investors to make the project economically more viable.

On July 28, 2012, a concession agreement was awarded to Dubai-based Rasia FZE (a Rasia Group investment company) for the feasibility, design, financing, construction and operation of a new railway link between Armenia and Iran having an operating period of 30 years, with a right of extension for another 20 years. The Armenia-Iran railway is called the Southern Armenia Railway project, which forms the key missing link in the International North-South Transport Corridor between the Black Sea and the Persian Gulf. Prior to the feasibility study being completed, the Southern Armenia Railway was anticipated to be a 316 km railway linking Gavar, 50 km east of Yerevan near Lake Sevan, with the Iranian border near Meghri.

On 24 January 2013, during an announcement and press conference, the previously signed concession agreement was announced and a separate tripartite memorandum of understanding was signed in Yerevan by Rasia FZE, Russian Railways (RZD) subsidiary South Caucasus Railway, and the government of Armenia concerning technical cooperation, investment, and the future operation of the Southern Armenia Railway. Rasia FZE announced its appointment of China Communications Construction Company as the "lead member of the development consortium" for the project and the commencement of the feasibility study.

Following a meeting on 3 September 2013 with Serzh Sargsyan, the President of Armenia, President Vladimir Putin of the Russian Federation stated that Russian Railways can invest about RUB 15 billion in the development of the Armenian Railway.

In mid-September 2013, Rasia FZE announced in a meeting with Armenian Prime Minister Tigran Sargsyan the achievement of a key milestone for the Southern Armenia Railway, including the release of a highly favorable feasibility study and the recommended railway design route from China Communications Construction Company.  Having reached this key milestone, Rasia FZE moved to secure essential regional cooperation for the financing, construction and operation stages of the project.  The feasibility study results indicated that the Southern Armenia Railway would cost approximately US $3.5 billion to construct, have a length of 305 kilometers from Gagarin to Agarak, and provide a base operating capacity of 25 million tons per annum. The railway will have 84 bridges spanning 19.6 kilometers and 60 tunnels of 102.3 kilometers, comprising 40% of the total project length.

As the key missing link in the International North–South Transport Corridor, the Southern Armenia Railway would create the shortest transportation route from the ports of the Black Sea to the ports of the Persian Gulf. The Southern Armenia Railway would establish a major commodities transit corridor between Europe and the Persian Gulf region, based on traffic volume forecasts of 18.3 million tons per annum. At completion of railway construction and commencement of operations, transport costs and times for the region are expected to improve substantially, fostering greater regional trade and economic growth with extraordinary direct benefits for the Armenian economy including an alleviation of the economic pressures caused by the blockade against Armenia by Turkey and Azerbaijan due to Armenia's and Azerbaijan's war over Karabakh.

Astara port inaugurated 

In March 2013 Iran inaugurated the port of Astara located south-west of the Caspian Sea.  The port has been integrated with the NSTC to improve its maritime connectivity across the Caspian Sea. Iran has invested 22 million dollars in the port and plan to increase investment by 10% to expand the port. The Current capacity is 600,000 tons but there is plans to increase this to 3 million tons. Commonwealth of Independent States (CIS) are the main producers of grains which will be exported to Africa through Iran Bandar Abbas port. The port will allow Russian goods to reach inland provinces of Iran faster and cheaper. Product from Russia, Azerbaijan, Kazakhstan, Turkmenistan can be sent to India through Iran's Bandar Abbas port which is the fastest way to reach India.

Iranrud Trans-Iranian canal
Iranrud (Iran's river) is a plan to build a canal from Caspian sea to Indian Ocean, with two routes, a river through Dasht-e Lut and another canal to Lake Urmia and after that to Persian Gulf. The idea of linking the Persian Gulf and the Caspian Sea by a canal was developed already in the late 19th century.

Bottleneck study of 2014

Dry runs of two routes were conducted in 2014, the first was Mumbai to Baku via Bandar Abbas and the second was Mumbai to Astrakhan via Bandar Abbas, Tehran and Bandar Anzali. The objective of the study was to identify and address key bottlenecks. The results showed transport costs were reduced by "$2,500 per 15 tons of cargo". Other routes under consideration include via Kazakhstan and Turkmenistan.

Current status
A dry run of container movement via the green corridor was conducted during April 2017 to test and verify the smooth customs facilitation, connecting India with Russia and Europe via Iran.

On July 7th, 2022, Russian company RZD Logistics announced that it has successfully completed its first transport of goods to India via the INSTC. This statement was also confirmed by Iranian and Indian trade companies.

Advantages of INSTC 
The positioning of the INSTC as an alternative to the conventional deep sea Suez Canal route is another significant benefit of this route, taking into account geostrategic and economic diplomacy for all the involved countries, particularly Iran and Russia, both of which are subject to U.S. sanctions, in addition to the fact that it is more cost-effective and saves a significant amount of travel time.

According to a survey by ‘Federation of Freight Forwarders Associations in India (FFFAI) found INSTC is “30 percent cheaper and 40 percent shorter than the traditional route via the Suez Canal.”

See also

 Asia-Africa Growth Corridor
Iranrud
Asian Highway Network
Transport in India
Transport in Russia
Transport in Iran
Transport in Armenia
Transport in Azerbaijan
Transport in Turkmenistan
 Rail transport in India
 Rail transport in Russia
 Rail transport in Iran
 Rail transport in Armenia
 Rail transport in Azerbaijan
 Rail transport in Turkmenistan

External links

References

Transport corridors
Transport in Turkmenistan
Rail transport in Turkmenistan
Railway lines in Turkmenistan
Rail transport in Russia
Economic history of Russia
Economy of Iran
Economic integration
Transnationalism
Rail transport in Asia
Rail transport in Europe
Rail cooperatives
Rail freight transport
International railway lines
International rail transport
Passenger rail transport
Transport in India
Transport in Iran
Transport in Mumbai
Caspian Sea
International road networks
Sea lanes
Caucasus
Economy of Central Asia
Road transport in Asia
Road transport in Europe
Transport in Central Asia
Trade routes